The Rajapaksa cabinet was the central government of Sri Lanka led by President Mahinda Rajapaksa between 2005 and 2015. It was formed in November 2005 after the presidential election and it ended in January 2015 after the opposition's victory in the presidential election. The cabinet was known as the Jambo Cabinet and holds the world record for the largest cabinet in the world.

Cabinet members

Deputy ministers, non-cabinet ministers and project ministers

References

 
 
  
 
 
 
  
  
 
 

Cabinet of Sri Lanka
2005 establishments in Sri Lanka
2015 disestablishments in Sri Lanka
Cabinets established in 2005
Cabinets disestablished in 2015
Mahinda Rajapaksa